Josef Fuchs (1814-1888) was a French illustrator. He designed wallpaper. Works by Fuchs are held in the collection of the Cooper-Hewitt, National Design Museum and the Deutsches Tapetenmuseum. The wallpaper piece, El Dorado, in the collection of the Cooper-Hewitt, was co-designed by Fuchs and Eugène Ehrmann and Georges Zipélius. It took them two years to design it. The work is still in print to this day.

References

French illustrators
1814 births
1888 deaths